Barkers Butts Rugby Football Club is a rugby union club in Allesley, Coventry, West Midlands. The first XV currently play in Midlands 2 West (South), a seventh tier league in the English rugby union system. The club operates four senior teams, a Colts side and the full range of junior teams for both boys and girls.

League history
When the league system was established in 1987, Barkers Butts was placed in the fifth tier, playing in Midlands 1 and were runners up in the first season of league rugby. They finished in second place twice more (1990–91 and 1992–93) but were relegated from tier 5, then called Courage League Division 5, after the 1994-95 season. and have not played at that level since. Subsequently, they have alternated between the sixth and seventh levels.

Club honours
Midlands 1 champions: 1993–94
Midlands 2 West (South) champions (2): 2004–05, 2010–11

References

External links
 

English rugby union teams
Rugby union in Warwickshire
Sport in Coventry